The 1998 Bayern Rundfahrt was the 19th edition of the Bayern Rundfahrt cycle race and was held on 26 May to 31 May 1998. The race started in Lohr am Main and finished in Berchtesgaden. The race was won by Steffen Kjærgaard.

General classification

References

Bayern-Rundfahrt
1998 in German sport